The Broseley Pipeworks is one of ten Ironbridge Gorge Museums administered by the Ironbridge Gorge Museum Trust. The museum is based in the small town of Broseley in the Ironbridge Gorge, in Shropshire, England within a World Heritage Site, acclaimed as the birthplace of the Industrial Revolution.

Once the site of the most prolific clay tobacco pipe makers in Britain, exporting worldwide, the works were abandoned in the 1950s. 

The museum preserves the details of the industry of clay tobacco pipe making and has a display of clay tobacco pipes, including the Churchwarden and Dutch Long Straw pipes.

The pipeworks are Grade II listed.

References

External links 
 Broseley Pipeworks

Museums in Shropshire
Industry museums in England
History of Shropshire
Ironbridge Gorge Museum Trust
Pipe makers
Industrial archaeological sites in England